A football pitch (also known as soccer field) is the playing surface for the game of association football. Its dimensions and markings are defined by Law 1 of the Laws of the Game, "The Field of Play". The pitch is typically made of natural turf or artificial turf, although amateur and recreational teams often play on dirt fields. Artificial surfaces are allowed only to be green in colour.

All line markings on the pitch form part of the area which they define. For example, a ball on or above the touchline is still on the field of play, and a foul committed over the line bounding the penalty area results in a penalty. Therefore, a ball has to completely cross the touchline to be out of play, and a ball has to fully cross the goal line (between the goal posts) in order for a goal to be scored; if any part of the ball is still on or above the line, a goal is not scored and the ball is still in play.

The field descriptions that apply to adult matches are described below. Because of the role of the British football associations in the history of the game, the dimensions of the field of play were originally formulated and expressed in imperial units.  Since 1997, the Laws of the Game have preferred metric units, with imperial equivalents given only in brackets.  Because the actual values have, in general, not changed since the early twentieth century, they tend to be round numbers in imperial units (for example the width of the goal, unchanged since 1863, is 8 yards or 7.32 metres). Use of the imperial values remains common, especially in the United Kingdom.

Pitch boundary

The pitch is rectangular in shape. The longer sides are called touchlines and the shorter sides are called the goal lines. All lines on the ground are equally wide, not to exceed . The corners of the pitch are marked by corner flags.

Although the term goal line is often taken to mean only that part of the line between the goalposts, in fact it refers to the complete line at either end of the pitch, from one corner flag to the other. In contrast the term byline (or by-line) is often used to refer to that portion of the goal line outside the goalposts. This term is commonly used in football commentaries and match descriptions, such as this example from a BBC match report: "Udeze gets to the left byline and his looping cross is cleared..."

Goals 

Goals are placed at the centre of each goal-line.
These consist of two upright posts placed equidistant from the corner flagposts, joined at the top by a horizontal crossbar. As a result, the area that players shoot at is 17.86 sq. metres (192 sq. feet). Nets are usually placed behind the goal, though are not required by the Laws.

Goalposts and crossbars have to be white, and made of wood, metal or other approved material. Rules regarding the shape of goalposts and crossbars are somewhat more lenient, but they have to conform to a shape that does not pose a threat to players. Since the beginning of football there have always been goalposts, but the crossbar was not invented until 1875, before which a string between the goalposts was used.

A goal is scored when the ball fully crosses the goal line between the goal-posts and beneath the crossbar, even if a defending player last touched the ball before it crossed the goal line (see own goal). A goal may, however, be ruled illegal (and void by the referee) if the player who scored or a member of their team commits an offence under any of the laws between the time the ball was previously out of play and the goal being scored. It is also deemed void if a player on the opposing team commits an offence before the ball has passed the line, as in the case of fouls being committed, a penalty awarded but the ball continued on a path that caused it to cross the goal line.

The football goal size for a junior match goal is approximately half the size of an adult sized match goal.

History of football goals and nets
Football goals were first described in England in the late 16th and early 17th centuries. In 1584 and 1602 respectively, John Norden and Richard Carew referred to "goals" in Cornish hurling. Carew described how goals were made: "they pitch two bushes in the ground, some eight or ten foote asunder; and directly against them, ten or twelue [twelve] score off, other twayne in like distance, which they terme their Goales". The first reference to scoring a goal is in John Day's play The Blind Beggar of Bethnal Green (performed circa 1600; published 1659). Similarly in a poem in 1613, Michael Drayton refers to "when the Ball to throw, And drive it to the Gole, in squadrons forth they goe". Solid crossbars were first introduced by the Sheffield Rules. Football nets were invented by Liverpool engineer John Brodie in 1891, and they were a necessary help for discussions about whether or not a goal had been scored.

Penalty and goal areas

Two rectangular boxes are marked out on the pitch in front of each goal.

The goal area (colloquially the "six-yard box"), consists of the rectangle formed by the goal-line, two lines starting on the goal-line  from the goalposts and extending  into the pitch from the goal-line, and the line joining these, i.e. they are a rectangle 6yds by 20yds. Goal kicks and any free kick by the defending team may be taken from anywhere in this area. Indirect free kicks awarded to the attacking team within the goal area are taken from the point on the line parallel to the goal line (the "six-yard line") nearest where the infringement occurred; they cannot be taken any closer to the goal line. Similarly drop-balls that would otherwise occur closer to the goal line are taken on this line.

The penalty area (colloquially "the 18-yard box" or just "the box") is similarly formed by the goal-line and lines extending from it, but its lines start  from the goalposts and extend  into the field. i.e. this is a rectangle 44yds by 18 yds.  This area has a number of functions, the most prominent being to denote where the goalkeeper may handle the ball and where a foul by a defender, usually punished by a direct free kick, becomes punishable by a penalty kick. Both the goal and penalty areas were formed as semicircles until 1902.

The penalty arc (colloquially "the D") is marked from the outside edge of the penalty area,  from the penalty mark; this, along with the penalty area, marks an exclusion zone for all players other than the penalty kicker and defending goalkeeper during a penalty kick.

Other markings

Similar to the penalty arc, this indicates the minimum distance that opposing players have to keep at kick-off; the ball itself is placed on the centre mark. During penalty shootouts all players other than the two goalkeepers and the current kicker are required to remain within this circle.

The half-way line divides the pitch in two. The half which a team defends is commonly referred to as being their half. Players have to be located within their own half at a kick-off and may not be penalised as being offside in their own half. The intersections between the half-way line and the touchline can be indicated with flags like those marking the corners – the laws consider this as an optional feature.

Turf

Grass is the normal surface of play, although artificial turf may sometimes be used especially in locations where maintenance of grass may be difficult due to inclement weather. This may include areas where it is very wet, causing the grass to deteriorate rapidly; where it is very dry, causing the grass to die; and where the turf is under heavy use. Artificial turf pitches are also increasingly common in the Nordic countries, due to the amount of snow during the winter months. The strain put on grass pitches by the cold climate and subsequent snow clearing has necessitated the installation of artificial turf in the stadia of many top-tier clubs in Norway, Sweden and Finland. The latest artificial surfaces use rubber crumbs, as opposed to the previous system of sand infill. Some leagues and football associations have specifically prohibited artificial surfaces due to injury concerns and require teams' home stadia to have grass pitches. All artificial turf has to be green and also meet the requirements specified in the FIFA Quality Concept for Football Turf.

Football can also be played on a dirt or gravel field. In most parts of the world dirt is used only for casual recreational play.

In the winter the pitch may be used for bandy by being filled with water which is allowed to freeze.

See also
 Football field (for each football code)
 Turf management
 Groundskeeping

References

Pitch
Sports rules and regulations
Sports venues by type
Grass field surfaces